The Answer to the Question is Tree63's third album. The original version contains ten tracks; a later released expanded edition contains five additional tracks.

Track listing
 "King"
 "Blessed Be Your Name"
 "You Only"
 "The Answer to the Question"
 "I Stand for You"
 "Over and Over Again"
 "So Glad"
 "But Now My Eyes Are Open"
 "Let Your Day Begin"
 "Overdue"
 "Maker of All Things" (New Expanded Edition Track)
 "Paradise" (New EE Track)
 "All Because" (Expanded Edition Acoustic Version)
 "King" (EE Acoustic Version)
 "You Only" (EE Acoustic Version)

References

2004 albums
Tree63 albums